Shahrak-e Darya Kenar (also Romanized as Shahrak-e Daryā Kenār; also known as Daryā Kenār) is a village in Barik Rud Rural District, in the Central District of Fereydunkenar County and Babolsar County, Mazandaran Province, Iran. At the 2006 census, its population was 581, in 192 families.

References 

Populated places in Fereydunkenar County